The 2001 Special Honours in New Zealand were two Special Honours Lists, published in New Zealand on 20 and 21 March 2001. Appointments were made to the New Zealand Order of Merit and the Queen's Service Order to recognise the incoming governor-general, Dame Silvia Cartwright, and the outgoing governor general and viceregal consort, Sir Michael and Lady Hardie Boys.

New Zealand Order of Merit

Principal Companion (PCNZM)
Additional
 The Honourable Dame Silvia Rose Cartwright  – Governor-General Designate

Companion of the Queen's Service Order (QSO)
Additional, for community service
 (Edith) Mary, Lady Hardie Boys

Additional, for public services
 The Right Honourable Sir Michael Hardie Boys  – Principal Companion of the Queen's Service Order and Governor-General and Commander-in-Chief in and over New Zealand since 1996

References

Special honours
Special honours